West End was one of the early group of Chicago punk rock clubs that included La Mere Vipere and O'Banion's, operating in the late 1970s and 1980s.  It was located at 1175 W. Armitage

History
Sue Miller of Lounge Ax was the club's booking agent and helped develop the early independent music scene in Chicago by her support of local and touring punk and indie bands of the day. She booked many unknown bands at West End that later became highly influential in the punk, alternative, and indie scenes.

References

Nightclubs in Chicago